Glória is a common Portuguese girl's name, the equivalent of Gloria in Spanish and English. It may also refer to:

Places
 Glória (Rio de Janeiro), a neighborhood in Rio de Janeiro, Brazil
 Glória, Bahia, a municipality in Bahia, Brazil
 Glória, Porto Alegre, a neighbourhood in Porto Alegre, Brazil
 Glória d'Oeste, a town in Central-West Region of Brazil

Other uses
 Glória (Bratislava), a high-rise residential building in Bratislava, Slovakia
 Grêmio Esportivo Glória, a Brazilian football club based in Vacaria, Rio Grande do Sul
 Hotel Glória, grand hotel in the Glória neighbourhood of Rio de Janeiro
 the Portuguese name of the 1999 film Gloria
 Glória (2021 TV series), a 2021 Portuguese television series streaming on Netflix

People with the given name
 Glória Pires (born 1963), Brazilian actress
 Glória Perez (born 1948), Brazilian telenovela writer
 Glória Menezes (born 1934), Brazilian actress

People with the surname
 Otto Glória (1917–1986), Brazilian football coach

See also
 Gloria (disambiguation)

Portuguese feminine given names